Sweetser House may refer to:

Sweetser Residence, Redondo Beach, California, listed on the National Register of Historic Places listings in Los Angeles County, California
Warren Sweetser House, Stoneham, Massachusetts, listed on the National Register of Historic Places in Middlesex County, Massachusetts
Daniel Sweetser House, Wakefield, Massachusetts, listed on the National Register of Historic Places in Middlesex County, Massachusetts
Michael Sweetser House, Wakefield, Massachusetts, listed on the National Register of Historic Places in Middlesex County, Massachusetts